The 2011–12 Iranian Futsal Super League was the 13th season of the Iran Pro League and the 8th under the name Futsal Super League. Shahid Mansouri Gharchak are the defending champions. The regular season, played from 30 August 2011.

Teams 

 1 In December 2011 Elmo Adab terminated their sports activities due to financial problems. Farsh Ara (Ara Carpet Company) owned by Gholam Ali Mortezaei took over their license.

Managerial changes

Before the start of the season

In season

League standings

Positions by round

Results table

Clubs season-progress

Top Goalscorers 

 Last updated: 9 March 2012

Awards 

 Winner: Shahid Mansouri Gharchak
 Runners-up: Giti Pasand Isfahan
 Third-Place: Foolad Mahan
 Top scorer:  Ahmad Esmaeilpour (Shahid Mansouri Gharchak) (32)

See also 
 2011–12 Iran Futsal's 1st Division
 2012 Iran Futsal's 2nd Division
 2011–12 Persian Gulf Cup
 2011–12 Azadegan League
 2011–12 Iran Football's 2nd Division
 2011–12 Iran Football's 3rd Division
 2011–12 Hazfi Cup
 Iranian Super Cup

References

External links 
 Futsal Planet 

Iranian Futsal Super League seasons
1